Samba Jacob Diallo (born 1958) is a Guinean boxer. He competed at the 1980 Summer Olympics and the 1988 Summer Olympics. At the 1988 Summer Olympics, he lost to Felipe Nieves of Puerto Rico.

References

1958 births
Living people
Guinean male boxers
Olympic boxers of Guinea
Boxers at the 1980 Summer Olympics
Boxers at the 1988 Summer Olympics
Place of birth missing (living people)
Bantamweight boxers